Butt-Ugly Martians is a computer-animated television series co-produced by Mike Young Productions, DCDC Limited and Just Entertainment. It was sold to ITV on October 2, 2000, for the original television pilot and premiered on CITV on February 19, 2001.

The series is produced using Alias Wavefront Maya 3D software.

Premise
The plot of the series begins when the Butt-Ugly Martians (B.U.M.) are forced to invade planets for the evil Emperor Bog, but when they are sent to Earth they become addicted to American culture. Deciding not to hurt Earth, they simply pretend to be occupying the planet for Bog. They are shown around by their Earthling friends: Mike, Cedric, and Angela. The Butt-Ugly Martians continue to hang out on Earth as long as Emperor Bog never finds out.

Characters

Main
 B-Bop A-Luna (voiced by Charlie Schlatter) – Commander B-Bop A-Luna is the diplomat and leader of the Butt-Ugly Martians. Brave, comedic, showy, and a little big headed (although increasingly less as the show went on), B-Bop can always be trusted to think up a good cover story and look convincing doing it. He's a natural leader, able to get even the most cowardly characters behind him even when he's not entirely sure what to do. Nevertheless, B-Bop can think on the fly and usually comes up with a plan that works. He also has a bit of a temper; 2T and Do-Wah are usually the two to calm him down. He is more tactile than the other two Martians. B-Bop is officially the commanding officer of 2T and Do-Wah in the Martian Fleet (he is occasionally addressed as "Commander" by the two). He wears a yellow uniform and a Yellow BKM suit. His age (along with 2T and Do-Wah's) is not revealed. It is assumed that the three are teenagers, although they refer to Mike, Cedric and Angela as kids.
 2T Fru-T (voiced by Rob Paulsen) – 2T Fru-T is the mechanic (described on the BUM merchandise as a "tech officer", he is most likely a lieutenant as he is of lower status than B-Bop but higher than Do-Wah) for the Butt-Uglies and inventor of BKM. Sometimes B.Bop and Do-Wah can pick on 2T although they are his friends. A mechanical prodigy, 2T is the MacGyver of Martians and has been able to construct anything from invisibility rays to the BKM (Butt Kicking Mode) suits using parts that were immediately available. He often finds himself at the mercy of sub-standard parts sent to him by Dr. Damage, but these never slow him down for long. 2T is a bit socially inept, often forgetting Earth colloquialisms and fading into technical jargon when it is not necessary. He's also a bad liar under stress, although he can think of a good cover story whenever B-Bop is indisposed. He's usually calm, but has been known to snap at his friends whenever he feels betrayed (this may be insecurity; one episode has him stopping Muldoon in his usual slew of anti-alien insults with a cracking voice, as if he's about to cry). He wears a blue uniform and a Blue BKM suit.
 Do-Wah Diddy (voiced by Jess Harnell) – Corporal Do-Wah Diddy is the fun Martian of the Butt-Uglies. Do-Wah has a huge appetite and loves milkshakes, hamburgers, junk food and all other unhealthy foods. Not surprisingly, Do-Wah is the fattest of the Martians (although not obese). Despite a prominent belly, Do-Wah has super-Martian strength (Martians on the show are stronger than humans by themselves, so this is a particularly powerful statement). Despite his thickness (or possibly because of it), he is extraordinarily sweet and usually the first to look on the bright side and find the good in people. Do-Wah has a light crush on Angela, the show's only female human. Do-Wah Diddy wears a red uniform and a Red BKM suit, and the merchandise gave his rank as a corporal.
 Shaboom Shabooma (voiced by Kath Soucie) – A female Martian secret agent. Dr. Damage mind-controlled her and sent her to Earth to remove the trio's ability to BKM so his new robot could destroy them. Luckily, 2T was able to locate the device controlling her to protect the earth and free her. She's aware of the trio's defection but keeps it a secret, and it is often implied that the Butt-Uglies have crushes on her.
 Michael "Mike" Ellis (voiced by Rob Paulsen) – A red-headed, green eyed 13-year-old boy, Mike is the unofficial and sometimes debatable leader of the human friends of the Martians. A typical teenager, Mike enjoys TV, junk food, hoverboarding, and the newest pop music. Mike is prone to bouts of big headedness, much like B-Bop, but can also get his confidence shattered readily whenever he's upset. Mike's also a pessimist at times, but is the first to jump in and take charge whenever the situation calls for it. Along the course of the show, Mike has been exposed to deadly radiation, electrocuted, kidnapped (twice), and subjected to several other unearthly threats. Mike hates it when people call him "Mikey".
 Angela Young (voiced by Kath Soucie) – The only female human ever shown on the show. Angela is level-headed and smart, often the voice of reason to the more reckless male characters on the show. Much to Mike's dismay, she is also very good at video games (breaking another stereotype in the process) and once saved the world with her skills with a joystick. Angela is typically considered beautiful by other alien species, and has been kidnapped twice as a result. Both instances had her fighting her kidnapper, but being rescued by the Martians anyway. Not quite a tomboy, Angela will sometimes "squeak" when she talks, especially when she's excited. Angela acknowledges that Do-Wah has a crush on her; whether she likes him back romantically is debatable.
 Cedric Cyles (voiced by Ogie Banks) – A 12-year-old boy, Cedric hangs out with Mike and Angela (he was moved forward in school, which explains his age and his height). Cedric has big glasses and, for some reason, brown eyes that reflect silver if the light hits them the right way (this was most likely an animation glitch or the light reflecting off of his glasses, as it is never addressed on the show). He is a technical wizard akin to 2T, although he is more of a computer hacker than a mechanic. Cedric also has incredible aim, able to hit very small targets from very far away. Cedric tends to make corny jokes which either go unheard or make him the target of strange looks. Cedric can be very nervous, and is sometimes seen wringing his hands in worry. Surprisingly, Cedric is obsessed with fame and, more importantly, fortune, with his quest for money leading to almost callousness towards his friends (although, in the end, he always pulls through). Overall, he's a good person. Cedric was never given a last name on the show.
 Stoat Muldoon (voiced by Robert Stack) – Stoat Muldoon is a well meaning but overly zealous alien hunter who discovers the martians on Earth several times throughout the series, but every time he has, the Martians have outwitted him and erased his memory. He has an underground base in the middle of the desert where he broadcasts his television show and dedicates his time to studying paranormal activity. Throughout most of the series, Stoat Muldoon is considered the antagonist of the show, but on a few special occasions, he joins forces with the Martians to defeat Emperor Bog and Dr. Damage. He is also allergic to nuts. His name is a reference to another famous alien obsesser, Fox Mulder of the X-Files. He is not evil, merely over-eager. Although he seems to be rather incompetent, he is a very brave man, as when the children were threatened by Klaktor, he put himself in danger to protect them despite having no weapon.
 Dog – Their robot pet dog that can fly and seems to always find a way to get the martians out of trouble.

Enemies
 Emperor Bog (voiced by S. Scott Bullock) – The evil but foolish ruler of the Martian populace, Bog is often fooled by the Butt-Ugly Martians' fake progress reports. He has little tolerance for imperfection, his idea of perfection being everything going according to what he wants. In short, Bog is little more than a whiny, spoiled brat. As the show progressed, Bog became more suspicious of his "loyal subjects". He likes to roll his R's. He is incredibly lazy, admitting to not even having to pluck his own nose hair, but for some reason has prominent abs and pecs.
 Dr. Damage (voiced by S. Scott Bullock) – Bog's more intelligent right-hand-man, Damage (pronounced "da-MAHJ") constantly suspects that the Butt-Uglies are up to something. He's usually right, but rarely noticed. Damage develops many instruments, machines and mutant creatures to conquer Earth, but these are usually destroyed by the Butt-Uglies, making Damage look like a fool in the process. He constantly insults Bog behind his back, despite Bog usually hearing him, and so always has to make up a compliment that sounds vaguely like what he was saying (e.g. "Royal nincompoop" becomes "loyal troops" in the first episode). He has also, on some occasions, tried to overthrow Emperor Bog as Martian Emperor. However, Emperor Bog eventually found out about this ambition and punished Damage by making him wash and wax every ship on their base, with Shaboom and Infi-Knight watch him to make sure that he did the job right.
 Jax The Conqueror – A warlord who despises Martians, but after being defeated and imprisoned by B-Bop and the others pretends to be willing to help them invade Earth to get a chance for revenge. He pilots a ship called the Doom Jax which is impervious to Martian weaponry. He has been "destroyed" three times in the series run, but always manages to come back.
 Humanga – A giant alien villain who is the only player of an alien game called Toget. Humanga has won as many games as the Butt-Uglies themselves.
 Infi-Knight – A four-armed robotic warrior created by Damage to speed the Earth invasion along. Probably the Butt-Uglies' most powerful enemy.
 Koo Foo – The last surviving member of an alien race. His race was an evil species that tried to conquer the whole universe 2000 Earth years ago before mysteriously vanishing. His crashed ship was submerged in the desert and believed to be a pyramid due to its shape. Muldoon accidentally released him at the same time the Martians arrived to destroy him. He took Angela to save her from danger but the Martians thought he was kidnapping her. It was eventually revealed that Koo Foo was not evil like the rest of his kind and had left the swarm of ships before crashing on Earth. He says he does not want to fight or hurt anyone. The Martians do not believe him until Angela points out that they themselves are different from almost all of their species. Koo Foo leaves in peace. He reappears as a one-off at Do-Wah's birthday party in the comic series.
 Gorgon – A fire-breathing lizard-like alien characterized by the ability to change into or possess others and a TERRIBLE smell. He speaks with a hiss.
 Klaktor – A Reconabot (portmanteau for "reconnaissance robot") that the Butt-Uglies defeated in the first episode, though he reappeared later in the series. Can fall apart and reassemble himself at will. This trait turned into a common sight gag; his action figure is equipped with ejectable arms.

Episodes

Merchandise

Video games
There were also three video games based on the series named Butt Ugly Martians: Zoom or Doom for PlayStation 2 and GameCube, Butt-Ugly Martians: B.K.M. Battles for Game Boy Advance, and Butt-Ugly Martians: Martian Boot Camp for PC. The franchise also had a toy line by Hasbro.

Home media
As part of Universal's broad arrangement for the franchise, Universal Studios Home Video obtained worldwide video rights to the series in October 2001, excluding the United Kingdom and Germany, where Just Entertainment (Abbey Home Media post-2002, following Just's insolvency) and BMG each held the rights.

United Kingdom

United States

Germany

References

External links
 

Extraterrestrial superheroes
Animated television series about extraterrestrial life
Fictional Martians
British computer-animated television series
American computer-animated television series
2000s British comic science fiction television series
2000s American comic science fiction television series
2000s British animated television series
2000s American animated television series
2001 British television series debuts
2001 American television series debuts
2003 British television series endings
2003 American television series endings
English-language television shows
British children's animated action television series
British children's animated adventure television series
British children's animated comic science fiction television series
American children's animated action television series
American children's animated adventure television series
American children's animated comic science fiction television series
Television series by Splash Entertainment